The 1999 All-SEC football team consists of American football players selected to the All-Southeastern Conference (SEC) chosen by the Associated Press (AP) and the conference coaches for the 1999 NCAA Division I-A football season.

The Alabama Crimson Tide won the conference, beating the Florida Gators 34 to 7 in the SEC Championship game.

Alabama running back Shaun Alexander was unanimously voted the coaches SEC Player of the Year and was selected as the AP SEC Offensive Player of the Year. Tennessee safety Deon Grant was voted the AP SEC Defensive Player of the Year.

Offensive selections

Quarterbacks
Tee Martin, Tennessee (AP-1, Coaches-1)
Clint Stoerner, Arkansas (AP-2, Coaches-2)
Quincy Carter, Georgia (AP-2)

Running backs
Shaun Alexander, Alabama (AP-1, Coaches-1)
 Deuce McAllister, Ole Miss (AP-1, Coaches-1)
Joe Gunn, Ole Miss (AP-2, Coaches-2)
Jamal Lewis, Tennessee (AP-2, Coaches-2)

Wide receivers
Darrell Jackson, Florida (AP-1, Coaches-1)
Anthony Lucas, Arkansas (AP-1, Coaches-2)
Freddie Milons, Alabama (Coaches-1)
Ronney Daniels, Auburn (AP-2, Coaches-2)
Cory Peterson, Ole Miss (AP-2)
Cedrick Wilson, Tennessee (AP-2)

Centers
Miles Luckie, Georgia (AP-1, Coaches-2)
Paul Hogan, Alabama (AP-2, Coaches-1)
Jeff Barrett, Vanderbilt (AP-1)

Guards
Cosey Coleman, Tennessee (AP-1, Coaches-1)
Cooper Carlisle, Florida (AP-2, Coaches-1)
Steve Herndon, Georgia (AP-1)
Cheston Blackshear, Florida (AP-2, Coaches-2)
Wes Shivers, Miss. St. (AP-2)
Bobbie Williams, Arkansas (Coaches-2)
Tutan Reyes, Ole Miss (Coaches-2)

Tackles
Chris Samuels, Alabama (AP-1, Coaches-1)
Todd Wade, Ole Miss (AP-1, Coaches-1)
Kenyatta Walker, Florida (AP-2, Coaches-2)
Jeno James, Auburn (Coaches-2)
Chad Clifton, Tennessee (Coaches-2)

Tight ends
James Whalen, Kentucky (AP-1, Coaches-1)
Joe Dean Davenport, Arkansas (AP-2, Coaches-2)
Elliott Carson, Vanderbilt (AP-2, Coaches-2)

Defensive selections

Defensive ends
Alex Brown, Florida (AP-1, Coaches-1)
Shaun Ellis, Tennessee (AP-1, Coaches-1)
Dennis Johnson, Kentucky (AP-2)
Kenny Smith, Alabama (AP-2)

Defensive tackles 
Darwin Walker, Tennessee (AP-1, Coaches-1)
Richard Seymour, Georgia (AP-1)
Gerard Warren, Florida (AP-2, Coaches-2)
Kindal Moorehead, Alabama (AP-2)
Kendrick Clancy, Ole Miss (AP-2)

Linebackers
Jamie Winborn, Vanderbilt (AP-1, Coaches-1)
Raynoch Thompson, Tennessee (AP-1, Coaches-1)
Barrin Simpson, Miss. St. (AP-1, Coaches-1)
Jeff Snedegar, Kentucky (Coaches-1)
John Abraham, South Carolina (AP-2)
Kendrell Bell, Georgia (AP-2, Coaches-2)
Orantes Grant, Georgia (AP-2, Coaches-2)
Armegis Spearman, Ole Miss (AP-2)
John Abraham, South Carolina (Coaches-2)
Eddie Strong, Ole Miss (Coaches-2)

Cornerbacks
Robert Bean, Miss. St. (AP-1, Coaches-2)
Fred Smoot, Miss. St. (AP-1, Coaches-2)
Dwayne Goodrich, Tennessee (AP-2, Coaches-1)
Larry Casher, Auburn (AP-1)
David Barrett, Arkansas (AP-2, Coaches-2)

Safeties 
Deon Grant, Tennessee (AP-1, Coaches-1)
Ashley Cooper, Miss. St. (AP-1, Coaches-1)
Kenoy Kennedy, Arkansas (AP-2, Coaches-1)
Ainsley Battles, Vanderbilt (AP-2, Coaches-2)
Anthony Wajda, Kentucky (Coaches-2)

Special teams

Kickers
Jeff Chandler, Florida (AP-1, Coaches-1)
Scott Westerfield, Miss. St. (AP-2, Coaches-2)
Les Binkley, Ole Miss (AP-2)

Punters
Andy Smith, Kentucky (AP-1, Coaches-1)
Jeff Walker, Miss. St. (AP-2, Coaches-2)
Corey Gibbs, LSU (AP-2)

All purpose/return specialist
Bo Carroll, Florida (AP-1)
Deuce McAllister, Ole Miss (AP-2)

Key

AP = Associated Press.

Coaches = selected by the SEC coaches

See also
1999 College Football All-America Team

References

All-Southeastern Conference
All-SEC football teams